Liria, or Llíria, is a town in Valencia, Spain.

Liria may also refer to:
KF Liria, a football team in Prizren, Kosovo
Liria Palace, in Madrid
Liria, an Albanian school founded by Hysen Hoxha
Liria, a British group playing Albanian folk music, founded by Dave Smith
Duke of Liria, a Dukedom of Spain
TV Liria, a television channel in Kosovo

See also
Lira (disambiguation)
Lyria (disambiguation)